Errol O'Neill (1945–2016) was an Australian activist, author, actor and playwright, based in Brisbane, Queensland. O'Neill was an activist for workers' rights and against the Vietnam War and apartheid in South Africa. These themes were reflected in his books and plays. He is also known for starring in East of Everything (2008), Frenchman's Farm (1987) and Surrender in Paradise (1976).

Selected works

References

External links 

 Errol O'Neill's entry in AusStage

Australian writers
Australian actors
1945 births
2016 deaths